Sviatlana Anatolyewna Khakhlova (born 2 October 1984) is a Belarusian backstroke, butterfly, freestyle and medley swimmer who won five medals at European championships in 2002–2011. She competed at the 2004, 2008 and 2012 Summer Olympics in six events, but did not reach the finals.

References

Living people
Olympic swimmers of Belarus
Swimmers at the 2004 Summer Olympics
Swimmers at the 2008 Summer Olympics
Swimmers at the 2012 Summer Olympics
Belarusian female backstroke swimmers
Belarusian female butterfly swimmers
Belarusian female freestyle swimmers
Belarusian female medley swimmers
1984 births
European Aquatics Championships medalists in swimming
Universiade medalists in swimming
Sportspeople from Minsk
Universiade gold medalists for Belarus
Medalists at the 2005 Summer Universiade
Medalists at the 2007 Summer Universiade
Medalists at the 2009 Summer Universiade